The Syr Darya, historically known as the Jaxartes, is a river in Central Asia. The name, which is Persian, literally means Syr Sea or Syr River. It is the northern and eastern of the two main rivers in the endorheic basin of the Aral Sea, the other being the Amu Darya (Jayhun).

In the Soviet era, extensive irrigation projects were constructed around both rivers, diverting their water into farmland and causing, during the post-Soviet era, the virtual disappearance of the Aral Sea, once the world's fourth-largest lake.

History

When the Macedonian army of Alexander the Great reached the Jaxartes in 329 BCE, after travelling through Bactria and Sogdia without encountering any opposition, they met with the first instances of native resistance to their presence. In October 329 BC the Macedonians fought the Battle of Jaxartes against the Saka, killing some 1200 combatants including the leader of the nomads. Alexander was forced to retire south to deal with a revolt in Sogdia. Alexander was wounded in the fighting that ensued and the native tribes took to attacking the Macedonian garrisons stationed in their towns. As the revolt against Alexander intensified it spread through Sogdia, plunging it into two years of warfare, the intensity of which surpassed any other conflict of the Anabasis Alexandri.  

On the shores of the Syr Darya Alexander placed a garrison in the City of Cyrus (Cyropolis in Greek), which he then renamed after himself Alexandria Eschate—"the farthest Alexandria"—in 329 BCE. For most of its history since at least the  Muslim conquest of Central Asia in the 7th to 8th centuries CE, the name of this city (in present-day Tajikistan) has been Khujand.

In the mid-19th century, during the Russian conquest of Turkestan, the Russian Empire introduced steam navigation to the Syr Darya, initially from Fort Raim but with an important river port at Kazalinsk (Kazaly) from 1847 to 1882, when service ceased.

During the Soviet era, a resource-sharing system was instituted in which Kyrgyzstan and Tajikistan shared water originating from the Amu Darya and Syr Darya rivers with Kazakhstan, Turkmenistan, and Uzbekistan in summer. In return, Kyrgyzstan and Tajikistan received Kazakh, Turkmen, and Uzbek coal, gas, and electricity in winter. After the 1991  fall of the Soviet Union this system disintegrated and the Central Asian nations have failed to reinstate it. Inadequate infrastructure, poor water-management, and outdated irrigation methods all exacerbate the issue.

In 2012, the Syrdarya–Turkestan State Regional Natural Park was opened in the Kazakhstan, in hopes of protecting the river plain ecosystems, archaeological sites, and historical-cultural monuments, as well as plants and animal species, some of which are rare or endangered.

Geography

Along its course, the Syr Darya irrigates the most productive agricultural regions in the whole of Central Asia, together with the towns of Kokand, Khujand, Kyzylorda and Turkestan.

Various local governments throughout history have built and maintained an extensive system of canals. These canals are of central importance in this arid region. Many fell into disuse in the 17th and early 18th century, but the Khanate of Kokand rebuilt many in the 19th century, primarily along the Upper and Middle Syr Darya.

Name
The second part of the name means "lake" or "sea" in Persian and "river" in the Central-Asian Persian. The current name dates only from the 18th century.

The earliest recorded name was Jaxartes or Iaxartes in Ancient Greek, consist of two morpheme Iaxa and artes, found in several sources, including those relating to Alexander the Great. The Greek name hearkens back to the Old Persian name Yakhsha Arta ("True Pearl"), perhaps a reference to the color of its glacially-fed water.  More evidence for the Persian etymology comes from the river's Turkic name up to the time of the Arab conquest, the Yinçü, or "Pearl river", from Middle Chinese  *t͡ɕiɪn-t͡ɕɨo. Tang Chinese also recorded this name as Yaosha River  (MC: *jɨɐk-ʃˠɛt) and later Ye River  (MC: *jiɛp).

Following the Muslim conquest, the river appears in the sources uniformly as the Seyhun, one of the four rivers flowing from the Paradise (in Arabic).

The current local name of the river, Syr (Sïr), does not appear before the 16th century. In the 17th century, Abu al-Ghazi Bahadur Khan, historian and ruler of Khiva, called the Aral Sea the "Sea of Sïr," or Sïr Tengizi.

Important evidence is the etymology of the name of the Syr-Darya River mentioned by the Ancient authors – '''Yaksart''' . established by V. A. Livshits (2003: 10). It means ‘'''flowing’, ‘streaming’.''' The word belongs to the Sogdian dialect that had emerged from the Saka language group.

Ecological damage
Massive expansion of irrigation canals in Middle and Lower Syr Darya during the Soviet period to water cotton and rice fields caused ecological damage to the area. The amount of water taken from the river was such that in some periods of the year, no water at all reached the Aral Sea. The Amu Darya in Uzbekistan and Turkmenistan faced a similar situation.

The uranium concentration of the stream water is increased in Tajikistan with values of 43 μg/L and 12 μg/L; the WHO guideline value for drinking water of 30 μg/L is partly exceeded. The main input of uranium occurs upstream in Uzbekistan and Kyrgyzstan.

See also
Extreme points of Tajikistan
History of the central steppe
Great Fergana Canal
Daryalyktakyr

Notes

References

External links

 Britannica.com
 
 Livius.org: Jaxartes 
 BBC News: Syn Darya in pictures

 
Sites along the Silk Road
Ramsar sites in Kazakhstan